The North Sutherland Rockets Football Club is an association football club from the North Sutherland area of the Sutherland Shire established in 1963. It is affiliated to the Sutherland Shire Football Assication.

References 

1963 establishments in Australia
Association football clubs established in 1963
Soccer clubs in Sydney